Earth Shaker is a Boulder Dash-inspired game published as a cover tape in 1990 in Your Sinclair (for the ZX Spectrum 48k). Notable in being the first covertape to subjectively set a high standard, having been initially rejected by publishers Zeppelin because of First Star's suing of companies publishing Boulder Dash clones.

Development 
The game was originally conceived as a Boulder Dash clone by Michael Batty, but its scope grew through a long development process:

References

External links
 This Is My Jam - Earth Shaker Spectrum Game
 World Of Spectrum - Earth Shaker
 Reloaded - Earth Shaker
 Earth Shaker (ZX Spectrum) Soundtrack

Puzzle video games
Rocks-and-diamonds games
1990 video games
Video games developed in the United Kingdom
ZX Spectrum games
ZX Spectrum-only games